Aliabad (also Romanized as ‘Alīābād; also known as Ali Abad Japlogh) is a village in Pachehlak-e Gharbi Rural District, in the Central District of Azna County, Lorestan Province, Iran. At the 2006 census, its population was 182, in 36 families.

References 

Towns and villages in Azna County